KDDL (94.3 FM, "Cattle Country 94.3") is an American radio station licensed to serve Chino Valley, Arizona.  Its coverage area includes Prescott, Prescott Valley and Chino Valley.  The station was acquired in 2007 by Sanford and Terry Cohen d/b/a Arizona's Hometown Radio Group and licensed to Prescott Valley Broadcasting Co. Inc. It airs a classic country music format.  Cattle Country is also heard via FM translator at 100.7 FM.  KDDL is a radio sponsor of Prescott Frontier Days, home of the World's Oldest Rodeo.  It broadcasts live every rodeo season from the Prescott Frontier Days Parade and also from the Chino Valley Territorial Days Parade every September.

KDDL is a member of the Prescott, Prescott Valley, Chino Valley and Cottonwood-Verde Valley Chambers of Commerce as well as a member of the Prescott Downtown Partnership

The station was assigned the "KDDL" call sign by the Federal Communications Commission on October 15, 2007.

References

External links

DDL
Country radio stations in the United States
Mass media in Yavapai County, Arizona
Radio stations established in 2007